Rameez Junaid and Purav Raja were the defending champions but lost in the quarterfinals to Andrey Golubev and Aleksandr Nedovyesov.

Golubev and Nedovyesov won the title after Marek Gengel and Lukáš Rosol withdrew before the final.

Seeds

Draw

References

External links
 Main draw

Amex-Istanbul Challenger - Doubles
2019 Doubles